The Trenton Sting were a Junior "A" ice hockey team from Trenton, Ontario, Canada.  They were a part of the Ontario Junior Hockey League.

History
In 1981, the Belleville Bobcats of the Metro Junior B Hockey League moved to Trenton.  In 1987, the Bobcats moved back to Belleville, but Trenton was granted a Junior C franchise in the Central Ontario Junior C Hockey League.

In 1989, the team moved over to the Eastern Ontario Junior C Hockey League that season, in which they stayed until 1995.  In 1995, the ownership of the team was granted the rights to a Junior "A" team, and renamed the Sting.

To fill the void in the Junior "C" loop, the Sting created a farm team known as the Brighton Buzz.  After two seasons, the Buzz became the Colborne Blackhawks.  Two seasons later, the team folded.

The Sting were sold to a private group and changed their name to the Quinte West Pack.  After the name change, the Pack played the franchises' worst season since 1996-97.  On April 10, 2008, the franchise was renamed the Trenton Hercs.

Effective noon January 8, 2009, the Trenton Hercs folded for the remainder of the 2008-09 season.  After 37 games, the Hercs record was 14 wins, 20 losses, and 3 overtime losses.  It was confirmed shortly after that the franchise is officially defunct.

Season-by-season results

Farm Team
  
When the Sting jumped from Junior C to Junior A, they formed a team in the area as a feeder, this team quickly fizzled out in four years.  From 1995 until 1997 they were known as the Brighton Buzz, from 1997 until 1999 they were known as the Colborne Blackhawks.  Their entire existence was in the Empire B Junior C Hockey League.

External links
Hercs Webpage

Notable alumni
Corey Ignas - UHL (Flint Generals) (Knoxville Speed)
Kurtis McLean - AHL (Wilkes-Barre/Scranton Penguins) NHL (Pittsburgh Penguins) (New York Islanders)
Mat Goody - AHL (Providence Bruins)  SPHL (Richmond Renegades)
Drew MacIntyre - AHL (Manitoba Moose) (Drafted by Detroit Red Wings - 4th Rnd in 2001 NHL Entry Draft)
Kevin Baker - AHL (Toronto Marlies) (Milwaukee Admirals) (Saint John Flames) (Lowell Lock Monsters) ECHL (Texas Wildcatters) (Drafted by Los Angeles Kings - 7th Rnd in 1999 NHL Entry Draft) OHL (Belleville Bulls)
Anthony Tapper - OHL (Toronto St. Michael's Majors)(Mississauga St. Michael's Majors)
Dustin Walsh - OHL (Ottawa 67's)

Ontario Provincial Junior A Hockey League teams